Hag in a Black Leather Jacket (1964) is a John Waters short film made in Baltimore, Maryland, starring Mona Montgomery and Mary Vivian Pearce.

Plot
A black man and a white girl (Mona Montgomery) are wed on a rooftop. He courts her by carrying her around in a trash can and chooses a Ku Klux Klansman to perform the wedding. The wedding guests are played by people dressed in early pop-influenced costumes such as American flags and tinfoil. Mary Vivian Pearce does a dance known as the Bodie Green.

Cast
Mona Montgomery as Ballerina/White Girl Bride
Mary Vivian Pearce as Bodie Green Dancer
John Waters

Production and availability
It was a "no budget film" that cost $30 to make and runs 17 minutes. 
In 2004–05, it was seen as part of Waters' traveling photography exhibit, John Waters: Change of Life.
In September 2014, it was shown, along with his other short films, as part of the "Fifty Years of John Waters" retrospective at the Film Society of Lincoln Center in New York City.

External links

1964 films
1964 short films
Films directed by John Waters
American independent films
American black-and-white films
1960s English-language films
1960s American films